Ahmed Souissi (born 7 December 1960) is a Tunisian footballer. He played in seven matches for the Tunisia national football team from 1991 to 1994. He was also named in Tunisia's squad for the 1994 African Cup of Nations tournament.

References

1960 births
Living people
Tunisian footballers
Tunisia international footballers
1994 African Cup of Nations players
Place of birth missing (living people)
Association football defenders